Half-Moon Friends (Hangul: 반달친구; RR: Bandalchingu) is a South Korean television entertainment program aired by JTBC from April 23, 2016 to July 16, 2016, total of 12 Episodes. It is also distributed online on MiaoPai, popular Chinese video-streaming application,  recording average of six million views for each episode and surpassing 32,100,000 views in accumulated number.

This is also the final activity of Nam Tae-hyun with WINNER, who soon left the group in November 2016.

Format 
The shows features Winner members interacting with children ranging from 4 to 7 years of ages. The show is meant to show the friendship that can grow between idols who have lived the trainee life for many years and children who often spend time alone due to busy parents.

WINNER members halt their promotional schedule to filmed the show in a daycare center for 15 days.

Cast

Teachers 

For the children to easily memorize the names of Winner members, they created cute nicknames for themselves.

Students

Episodes

References 

2016 South Korean television series debuts
2016 South Korean television series endings